The Kabul Times Daily is a state-run English-language newspaper in Afghanistan, initially established on February 27, 1962 as The Kabul Times. , it had a daily circulation of 47,000 and is offered in both print and online formats. 

Following the Saur Revolution, The Kabul Times was renamed Kabul New Times and began to print Communist rhetoric that was reminiscent of days during the Cold War and was highly confrontational towards Western culture.

The paper briefly stopped publication during the US-led invasion, resuming in March 2002. Following the fall of Kabul to the Taliban, the editor-in-chief Hamidullah Arefi resigned; after a brief period of vacancy, Nik Mohammad was appointed as new editor and the paper was renamed The Kabul Times Daily.

References

External links
Official website
Kabul Times, 1962–1980, University of Arizona Libraries Digital Collections.
Kabul Times, 1962–1983, Criss Library, University of Nebraska at Omaha. 

Daily newspapers published in Afghanistan
English-language newspapers published in Asia
Mass media in Kabul
Publications established in 1962
1962 establishments in Afghanistan